Anolis valencienni, the Jamaican twig anole or short-tail anole, is a species of lizard in the family Dactyloidae. The species is found in Jamaica.

References

Anoles
Reptiles described in 1837
Endemic fauna of Jamaica
Reptiles of Jamaica
Taxa named by André Marie Constant Duméril
Taxa named by Gabriel Bibron